The Department of Industries of state of Tamil Nadu is one of the Department of Government of Tamil Nadu

Objective & Functions of the Department 
 The foremost objective of this department is to promote industrial growth by facilitating setting up of important industries in Tamil Nadu through transparent procedures, removal of bottlenecks fast decision making and single window clearance

Sub-departments

Undertakings and bodies

Present Ministers for Industries 
 Thangam Thennarasu

Former Ministers for Industries 

 2021- onwards
Thangam Thennarasu
 2018 - 2021
C.Ve.shanmugam
 2016 - 2018
 M. C. Sampath
 2011 - 2016
 P. Thangamani

See also 
 Government of Tamil Nadu
 Tamil Nadu Government's Departments
 Ministry of Coal (India)
 Ministry of Commerce and Industry (India)
 Ministry of Mines (India)
 Ministry of Micro, Small and Medium Enterprises
 Ministry of Steel (India)
 Ministry of Heavy Industries and Public Enterprises (India)

References

External links
 www.tn.gov.in/departments/industries.html  (Official Website of the Tamil Nadu Industries Department)
 http://www.tn.gov.in (Official website of Government of Tamil Nadu)

Tamil Nadu state government departments
State industries departments of India
Economy of Tamil Nadu
1811 establishments in India